The women's singles wheelchair tennis competition at the 1988 Summer Paralympics in Seoul from 15 until 24 October 1988. It was a demonstration sport and there wasn't a match for the third place (two bronze medals were awarded)

Draw

Key
 INV = Bipartite invitation
 IP = ITF place
 ALT = Alternate
 r = Retired
 w/o = Walkover

Finals

References 
 

Women's singles